Ploddy the Police Car on the Case (also released as Bold Eagles) is a 2013 Norwegian 3D computer-animated adventure film directed by Rasmus A. Sivertsen and Rune Spaans from a screenplay by Arthur Johansen. A sequel to Ploddy the Police Car Makes a Splash (2009), it is the third film to be based on the Norwegian children's character Pelle Politibil (Ploddy the Police Car).

Premise 
Ploddy the Police Car is assigned to guard the largest attraction in the brand new Eagle Park in Bodø; an endangered eagle and her egg. However, two thieves steal the eagle and Ploddy ends up hatching the egg under his hood, and it is up to him to save the eagle all while taking care of her newly-hatched baby.

Release 
The film was released on 3 March 2013 in Norway, and grossed $2,102,960 from 158,029 admissions, for a worldwide total of $2,220,689.

References

Notes

External links 

Films directed by Rasmus A. Sivertsen